Michael Talia (born 11 February 1993) is a former professional Australian rules footballer who played for the Western Bulldogs and Sydney Swans in the Australian Football League (AFL). He is the brother of Daniel Talia who plays for the Adelaide Football Club, and is the grandson of Harvey Stevens, a former Footscray player leading the club to their first premiership in 1954. His great-grandfather, Arthur Stevens, also played for Footscray.

Talia was recruited by the Western Bulldogs in the 2011 national draft with pick 39 and made his debut in round 19, 2012, against  at Etihad Stadium. He earned the round 15 nomination for the 2013 AFL Rising Star after a 32-possession game against .

In round 1, his first game for the Swans, he suffered a Lisfranc ligament injury in the last quarter against Collingwood, ruling him out for the next eight to twelve weeks. Dane Swan also suffered the same injury, as well as multiple fractures in his foot and lower leg. Complications with the injury saw him placed on the long-term injury list.

In July 2016, Talia was arrested and charged with possession of cocaine and he later pleaded guilty to the charges and was placed on a twelve-month good behaviour bond.

Talia was delisted at the conclusion of the 2017 season.

Statistics
 Statistics are correct to the end of the 2017 season

|- style="background-color: #EAEAEA"
! scope="row" style="text-align:center" | 2012
|
| 32 || 4 || 1 || 0 || 30 || 24 || 54 || 18 || 4 || 0.3 || 0.0 || 7.5 || 6.0 || 13.5 || 4.5 || 1.0
|-
! scope="row" style="text-align:center" | 2013
|
| 32 || 9 || 0 || 0 || 92 || 82 || 174 || 40 || 11 || 0.0 || 0.0 || 10.2 || 9.1 || 19.3 || 4.4 || 1.2
|- style="background:#eaeaea;"
! scope="row" style="text-align:center" | 2014
|
| 32 || 3 || 0 || 0 || 18 || 18 || 36 || 10 || 1 || 0.0 || 0.0 || 6.0 || 6.0 || 12.0 || 3.3 || 0.3
|-
! scope="row" style="text-align:center" | 2015
|
| 32 || 14 || 2 || 1 || 126 || 109 || 235 || 82 || 19 || 0.1 || 0.1 || 9.0 || 7.8 || 16.8 || 5.9 || 1.4
|- style="background:#eaeaea;"
! scope="row" style="text-align:center" | 2016
|
| 32 || 1 || 0 || 0 || 7 || 3 || 10 || 3 || 1 || 0.0 || 0.0 || 7.0 || 3.0 || 10.0 || 3.0 || 1.0
|- class="sortbottom"
! colspan=3| Career
! 31
! 3
! 1
! 273
! 236
! 509
! 153
! 36
! 0.1
! 0.0
! 8.8
! 7.6
! 16.4
! 4.9
! 1.2
|}

References

External links

1993 births
Living people
Western Bulldogs players
Australian rules footballers from Victoria (Australia)
Calder Cannons players
Australian people of Italian descent
Sydney Swans players
Norwood Football Club players
Williamstown Football Club players